James Munro may refer to:

James Munro (sealer) (c. 1779–1845), Tasmanian settler
James Munro (VC) (1826–1871), Scottish soldier, recipient of the Victoria Cross
James Munro (Australian politician) (1832–1908), 15th Premier of Victoria
Jimmy Munro (footballer, born 1870) (1870–1899), Scottish footballer (Bolton Wanderers, Burton Swifts and Swindon Town)
Jimmy Munro (footballer, born 1905) (1905–1978), Scottish footballer (St Johnstone, Cardiff City)
Jimmy Munro (footballer, born 1926) (1926–1997), Scottish footballer (Manchester City)
James Munro (Scottish footballer), Scottish footballer (Queen's Park)
Jim Munro (1870–1945), New Zealand politician of the Labour Party
James S. Munro (1846–?), politician in Ontario, Canada
James Munro, pseudonym of British thriller writer James Mitchell (born 1962)
Jim Munro (journalist) (born 1962), British journalist
Jimmie Munro (James Leslie Munro, 1906–1974), Australian jockey, later trainer
James Munro (racing driver) (born 1997)

See also 
 James Monroe (disambiguation)
 James Munroe (disambiguation)